Norman Peach (1889–1974) was an Australian tennis player. He was born in New Zealand and his family moved to Australia when he was a boy. Peach's best stroke was a flat forehand drive and he always fought hard to win when close to defeat. Peach captained Australasia in Davis Cup in 1921 and won the New South Wales State Championships in 1925.  Peach first entered the Australasian Championships in 1919 aged 30 and lost in the third round to Alfred Beamish. In 1921, Peach lost in the opening round of the U. S. Championships to William Ingraham. At the 1922 Australasian Championships, Peach beat Edward Jordan, Rupert Wertheim and Jack Clemenger before losing in the semi finals to James Anderson. At the 1925 Australasian Championships, Peach lost in the quarter finals to Richard Schlesinger. In the 1926 Australasian Championships, Peach beat Harry Hopman before losing in the quarters to Schlesinger. In the 1928 Australian championships, Peach lost in round three to Gerald Patterson. In 1930 he lost in round two to Schlesinger. In 1931 he lost in round two to Clifford Sproule.

Grand Slam finals

Doubles (1 runner-up)

References

1889 births
1974 deaths
Australian male tennis players
New Zealand emigrants to Australia